William Henry Cunliffe Jr. (born June 26, 1956), is an American jazz pianist and composer.

Early life
Cunliffe was born in Andover, Massachusetts. He discovered music at an early age, with particular emphasis on classical music as well as jazz-oriented music from the 1960s and 1970s: "My mother was a good pianist...I started just copying little things that I would hear my mom play and I would sit next to her and listen.

Cunliffe described himself as having been drawn to "anything with hip harmony in it" with great melodies, and he loved listening to The 5th Dimension, Burt Bacharach, and Herb Alpert. He attended Phillips Academy and graduated in 1974 in the school's first co–educational class. In college, he performed rock and roll at the Prince Spaghetti House in Saugus, Massachusetts. He attended Wesleyan University for several years. During this time, a friend introduced him to a record by Oscar Peterson, and after listening to this record, Cunliffe became a "jazz player overnight." While in school, he considered careers in medicine and psychology, but in his junior year, he decided finally that "music was it."

After graduating from Duke University, he received his master's degree from the Eastman School of Music.

Career
For two and a half years, Cunliffe taught music at Central State University in Wilberforce, Ohio. He then toured as pianist and arranger with the Buddy Rich Big Band. He returned to Southern Ohio for a few years, where he was the "house pianist" at the Greenwich Tavern in Cincinnati, playing with Woody Shaw, Joe Henderson, Freddie Hubbard, Benny Golson and James Moody. In 1989 he moved to Los Angeles, and shortly after that won the 1989 Thelonious Monk Jazz Piano Competition, which was judged by pianists Hal Galper, Ahmad Jamal, and Barry Harris. Cunliffe worked occasionally with Buell Neidlinger's group "Thelonious," and in 1990 joined the Clayton Hamilton Jazz Orchestra, and the Clayton Brothers Quartet, recording a number of albums with them. He also worked in duo with jazz flutist Holly Hofmann, touring and recording on the Capri and Azica labels with her, notably, the session "Live at Birdland," with the great bassist Ray Brown.

Cunliffe made three jazz albums for Warner/Discovery Records which achieved recognition in nationwide jazz polls, including Bill in Brazil during a stint in Rio de Janeiro that was well received. He recorded several albums for Azica Records, including Satisfaction, a solo piano outing, Live at Rocco, with his sextet, and Partners in Crime, a Hammond B3 session with guitarist Jim Hershman and drummer Jeff Hamilton. In 2000, he recorded  a sextet session of Earl Zindars' music, and in 2001 Cunliffe documented his working trio of ten years with Live at Bernies, which was released on both CD and vinyl. Cunliffe has been a member of LaBarbera's quintet featuring saxophonist Bob Sheppard and trumpeter Clay Jenkins virtually since its formation in the early 1990s.

In 2003, Cunliffe recorded his Latin octet Imaginacion, on Torii, which reached No. 2 in nationwide radio jazz charts. He is a Baldwin Pianos artist, and was Marian McPartland's guest on her famed Piano Jazz radio show in 1998.

Cunliffe led the Resonance Jazz Orchestra at the Playboy Jazz Festival in Hollywood, California, in June 2011. He accompanied pianist Marian Petrescu in selections from the Resonance Jazz Orchestra Plays Tribute to Oscar Peterson CD.

In the 1990s, Cunliffe wrote a number of educational publications. His book Jazz Keyboard Toolbox was published by Alfred Publications and became a standard reference in jazz. Next came an educational DVD and book on beginning blues piano called MAX Blues Keyboard, also for Alfred. He then published Jazz Inventions for Keyboard, short pieces in the style of the Chopin Preludes and Bach Inventions, with an accompanying audio CD. More recently, he published Uniquely Familiar, a book of through-composed arrangements of jazz standards, followed by a similar collection entitled "Uniquely Christmas."

Cunliffe has composed numerous works for big band, orchestra, chamber groups, and choir, and has been performed by many orchestras, including the Cincinnati Pops Orchestra, the Illinois Philharmonic, the Reading Symphony, the Rio Hondo Symphony Orchestra, the Manhattan School of Music Symphony, the Temple University and Cal State Fullerton Symphonies, and the Henry Mancini Institute Orchestra. He has written for television, and for film, including the Kareem Abdul-Jabbar-produced film, On the Shoulders of Giants (2011).

Cunliffe's concerto for trumpet and orchestra entitled fourth stream... La Banda (2010) was nominated for a Grammy in that year, and was premiered by Terell Stafford and the Temple University Symphony Orchestra, conducted by Luis Biava, at Verizon Hall in Philadelphia, and at Alice Tully Hall in New York City.  His three-movement piano concerto Overture, Waltz and Rondo, for piano and chamber orchestra was inspired both by jazz and by the music of Wolfgang Amadeus Mozart; this piece was also nominated for a Grammy in 2012. Cunliffe composed a tuba concerto in 2011 for Los Angeles studio and orchestral tubist Jim Self. He also recorded a piano and tuba version of the piece; the two versions are coupled on the Metre Records release. Temple University commissioned another concerto from him in late 2012; he took a chamber piece that he had written in 2004 based on Brazilian themes, and expanded it into a three movement saxophone concerto, which he recorded in Philadelphia in 2013 with Biava, the Temple orchestra, and the great saxophonist Dick Oatts. Cunliffe's Symphony #1, Hearts Reaching Upward premiered in 2013 by trumpeter Kye Palmer, and the Cal State Fullerton Wind Ensemble.

Teaching
Cunliffe is Professor of Music at California State University Fullerton, where he was honored as "Distinguished Faculty Member" in 2010. In addition, he has taught at such institutions as Central State University, Musicians Institute in Hollywood, California State University, Northridge, the University of Southern California, and Temple University.

He has conducted numerous workshops and clinics as well. Ongoing residencies include the Skidmore Jazz Institute, and the Vail Jazz Workshop.  In 2010, he made a DVD teaching beginning jazz and blues piano. He is composer-in-residence at All Saints Episcopal Church, in Pasadena, California. He composes and performs with his trio, big band, and Latin jazz group Imaginacion.

Awards
Cunliffe won the 2010 Grammy Award for Best Instrumental Arrangement of Oscar Peterson's "West Side Story Medley". In 2006, he was nominated for a Grammy award for his jazz arrangement of the Steely Dan song "Do It Again". When he was a student at Eastman, he received two awards from DownBeat magazine for arranging and composing.

In 1989, he won the Thelonious Monk International Jazz Piano Award. He received stipends from the National Endowment for the Arts. He won a grant from the New Zealand School of Music and the Rodger Fox Big Band of New Zealand released an album of Cunliffe's jazz orchestra compositions. In 2005, he won the Philadelphia Jazz Composer competition sponsored by the American Composer Federation. In the 1990s, he was nominated for three Emmys for best original song for the television soap operas Another World and Guiding Light.

Books
 Jazz Keyboard Toolbox, Alfred Publications (2000)
 Jazz Piano Inventions, Alfred Publications (2005)
 MAX Blues Keyboard, Alfred Publications (2004)
 Uniquely Familiar, Alfred Publications (2010)
 Uniquely Christmas, Alfred Publications (2012)

Discography

Awards and nominations

References

External links
Official website
Interview at All About Jazz

Living people
American Episcopalians
American jazz composers
American jazz pianists
American male pianists
American music arrangers
American writers about music
Jingle writers
Central State University faculty
Duke University alumni
Wesleyan University alumni
Eastman School of Music alumni
1956 births
California State University, Fullerton faculty
20th-century American pianists
21st-century American pianists
American male jazz composers
20th-century American male musicians
21st-century American male musicians
Clayton-Hamilton Jazz Orchestra members
Resonance Records artists